Bubu Lubu is a popular brand of chocolate bars from Mexico, featuring a strawberry and marshmallow filling with a chocolate covering. It is manufactured by Barcel (under the control of the Bimbo Company). Bubu Lubu is sold by Grupo Bimbo's candy brand, Ricolino. In the United States, Bubu Lubu are sold in many Mexican grocery stores and international supermarkets. Bubu Lubu is often eaten frozen.

See also
 Paleta Payaso, a chocolate lollipop made by Ricolino

Brand name confectionery
Marshmallows
Strawberry dishes
Grupo Bimbo brands